Lopirazepam (INN) is a short-acting benzodiazepine analog of the pyridodiazepine type (specifically, the pyridodiazepine analog of lorazepam) with anxiolytic and hypnotic properties. It has never been marketed.

See also
Benzodiazepine

References

Abandoned drugs
Lactims
Chloroarenes
GABAA receptor positive allosteric modulators
Lactams
Pyridodiazepines